A ser is an obsolete unit of dry volume in India. In 1871 it was defined as being exactly 1 litre. After metrication in the mid-20th century, the unit became obsolete. It was the unit in pre-modern India which was so close to the metric values of volume approx equal to a litre.

See also
List of customary units of measurement in South Asia

References

Units of volume
Customary units in India
Obsolete units of measurement